LA Law: The Computer Game is a video game developed by Synergistic Software for MS-DOS and compatible operating systems and published by Capstone Software in 1992. The game is based on the TV show L.A. Law.

Gameplay
The object of the game is to solve a case. Cases are solved in a point-and-click interface. The other goal is that prove worthy for a law firm. Information about the case must be gathered. When ready, the case is taken to court. During court, there is a choice of whom to speak to and which evidence to give.  The first such case is called "The Wrathful Race" involving a man accused of vehicular homicide.  The judge may, for example, allow a continuance in order for the defense to gather evidence, but 9 hours (this is simulated elapsed time and not actual elapsed time) may be the maximum time allowed to review evidence and interview the widow, the medical examiner, a private investigator, etc. before the case will be brought to court.  The judge will typically not allow the player, acting as the defense, to object to a statement by the prosecution if he or she is permitted to establish the evidence and the date and time the alleged crime was committed.  A defense composed merely of an assertion by the defendant that the victim was a bad driver and died due to his own negligence, is usually insufficient, because it does not refute that the defendant knew about the accident and willingly left the scene.

The instruction manual which came with the game also advised users on what numbers to call in order to gather the necessary evidence in the allotted time.

Reception

Reviews
Just Games Retro
Pelit

References

External links

1992 video games
Adventure games
Criminal law video games
DOS games
DOS-only games
Single-player video games
Synergistic Software games
Video games based on television series
Video games developed in the United States